50 Documentaries to See Before You Die is a 2011 television special aired on Current TV. Presented by Morgan Spurlock, the series features a ranking of fifty documentary films.

Summary
This limited series, presented by Morgan Spurlock and on the television network Current TV, featured what editors regard as fifty of the most influential and/or important documentary films from the 25 years prior to the series' debut. It aired in five hour-long episodes, each detailing ten entries on the list in a clip show format. In association with the series, Current TV aired some of the documentaries featured on the list.

The fifty titles were selected by a panel including film professor Michael Renov, International Documentary Association's then-president Eddie Schmidt, and television executive Brian Graden.

Episodes

"Life After Donkey Kong"
 50. Spellbound, by Jeffrey Blitz (2002)
 49. Madonna: Truth or Dare, by Alek Keshishian (1991)
 48. The Kid Stays in the Picture, by Nanette Burstein and Brett Morgen (2002)
 47. One Day in September, by  Kevin Macdonald (1999)
 46. Little Dieter Needs to Fly, by Werner Herzog (1998)
 45. The Decline of Western Civilization Part II: The Metal Years, by Penelope Spheeris (1988)
 44. Burma VJ, by Anders Østergaard (2008)
 43. When the Levees Broke: A Requiem in Four Acts, by Spike Lee (2006)
 42. Catfish, by Henry Joost and Ariel Schulman (2010)
 41. The King of Kong: A Fistful of Quarters, by Seth Gordon (2007)

 "The Boy Who Loves Jesus Grows Up" 
 40. When We Were Kings, by Leon Gast (1996)
 39. Biggie & Tupac, by Nick Broomfield (2002)
 38. March of the Penguins, by Luc Jacquet (2005)
 37. Inside Job, by Charles H. Ferguson (2010)
 36. Taxi to the Dark Side, by Alex Gibney (2007)
 35. Paragraph 175, by Rob Epstein and Jeffrey Friedman (2000)
 34. Brother’s Keeper, by Joe Berlinger and Bruce Sinofsky (1992)
 33. Tongues Untied, by Marlon Riggs (1989)
 32. Dogtown and Z-Boys, by Stacy Peralta (2001)
 31. Jesus Camp, by Rachel Grady and Heidi Ewing (2006)

 "When Morgan Spurlock Met Mr. Brainwash" 
 30. Fahrenheit 9/11, by Michael Moore (2004)
 29. Man on Wire, by James Marsh (2008)
 28. Gasland, by Josh Fox (2010)
 27. Tarnation, by Jonathan Caouette (2003)
 26. Murderball, by Henry Alex Rubin and Dana Adam Shapiro  (2005)
 25. Enron: The Smartest Guys in the Room, by Alex Gibney  (2005)
 24. Paradise Lost: The Child Murders at Robin Hood Hills, by Joe Berlinger and Bruce Sinofsky  (1996)
 23. The Eyes of Tammy Faye, by Fenton Bailey  (2000)
 22. Dixie Chicks: Shut Up and Sing, by Barbara Kopple and Cecilia Peck  (2006)
 21. Exit Through the Gift Shop, by Banksy  (2010)

 "When Morgan Spurlock Went to a Drag Ball"
 20. Capturing the Friedmans, by Andrew Jarecki (2003)
 19. Touching the Void, by Kevin Macdonald (2003)
 18. Food, Inc., by Robert Kenner (2008)
 17. Street Fight, by Marshall Curry (2005)
 16. Bus 174, by José Padilha and Felipe Lacerda (2002)
 15. Crumb, by Terry Zwigoff (1994)
 14. Dark Days, by Marc Singer (2000)
 13. The Fog of War, by Errol Morris (2003)
 12. Bowling for Columbine, by Michael Moore (2002)
 11. Paris Is Burning, by Jennie Livingston (1990)

 "Top 10 Docs To See Before You Die" 
 10. Grizzly Man, by Werner Herzog (2005)
 9. Trouble the Water, by Tia Lessin and Carl Deal (2008)
 8. An Inconvenient Truth, by Davis Guggenheim (2006)
 7. The Celluloid Closet, by Rob Epstein and Jeffrey Friedman (1995)
 6. The War Room, by Chris Hegedus and D.A. Pennebaker (1993)
 5. Super Size Me, by Morgan Spurlock (2004)
 4. Waltz with Bashir, by Ari Folman (2008)
 3. Roger & Me, by Michael Moore (1989)
 2. The Thin Blue Line, by Errol Morris (1988)
 1. Hoop Dreams, by Steve James (1994)

See also50 Films to See Before You DieInternational Documentary Association top 25 documentariesCapturing Reality: The Art of Documentary''

References

External links
 
TV.com
IMDb list of the 50 Documentaries to See Before You Die

2010s American documentary television series
2011 American television series debuts
2011 American television series endings
Current TV original programming
Works about documentary film
Lists of documentary films
Top film lists